Bonnétable is a commune in the Sarthe department in the region of Pays de la Loire, northwestern France.

Bonnétable is twinned with Horncastle in rural Lincolnshire. The towns' relationship is commemorated by a Rue Horncastle in Bonnétable, and a Bonnetable (sic; no acute accent on the e) Road in Horncastle.

See also
Communes of the Sarthe department

References

Communes of Sarthe
Maine (province)
Sarthe communes articles needing translation from French Wikipedia